The 2020–21 North Carolina Tar Heels men's basketball team represented the University of North Carolina at Chapel Hill during the 2020–21 NCAA Division I men's basketball season. The team was coached by Roy Williams, who was in his 18th and final season as UNC's head men's basketball coach. The Tar Heels played their home games at the Dean Smith Center in Chapel Hill, North Carolina as members of the Atlantic Coast Conference. They finished the 18–11, 10–6 in ACC play to finish in a tie for fifth place. As the No. 6 seed in the ACC Tournament, they defeated Notre Dame and Virginia Tech, before losing to Florida State in the semifinals. North Carolina received an at-large bid to the NCAA tournament as the No. 8 seed in the Midwest region. They lost in the first round to 9th-seeded Wisconsin.

On February 27, 2021, Roy Williams won his 900th career game in a win over Florida State, becoming the 5th and fastest Division I men's head coach to reach the milestone. On March 6, 2021, UNC completed a season sweep over rival Duke in a 91–73 win. Following the win, Roy Williams kissed the Smith Center court, causing speculation of possible retirement. Williams later said it was because of the team's 10–1 home record.

Following the season, Williams announced he was retiring after 18 years as head coach of North Carolina and 33 years of coaching. Several days later, the school named assistant coach Hubert Davis as the team's new head coach.

Previous season
The Tar Heels finished the 2019–20 season 14–19, 6–14 in ACC play to finish in three-way tie for last place. As the No. 14 seed in the ACC tournament, they defeated Virginia Tech before losing to Syracuse in the second round. Though the Tar Heels were ineligible for postseason play due to their record, all postseason tournaments, including the remainder of the ACC Tournament, the NCAA tournament, and NIT were canceled due to the pandemic.

Offseason

Departures

2020 recruiting class

2021 recruiting class

Roster

Schedule and results

|-
!colspan=12 style=| Non-conference regular season

|-
!colspan=12 style=|ACC Regular Season

|-
!colspan=12 style=|ACC tournament

|-
!colspan=12 style=| NCAA tournament

Source:

Rankings

On January 18, 2021, Duke fell out of the AP Top 25 ranking for the first time since February 8, 2016. This broke a 59-year streak and marked the first time since December 25, 1961 that the powerhouse trio of Duke, Kentucky and North Carolina were all out of the Top 25 ranking.

^Coaches did not release a Week 1 poll.

References

North Carolina Tar Heels men's basketball seasons
Tar
North Carolina
North Carolina